Bagan is a union council of Abbottabad District in Khyber-Pakhtunkhwa province of Pakistan. According to the 2017 Census of Pakistan, the population is 11,512.

Subdivisions
Bagan
Jhansa
Lassan

References

Union councils of Abbottabad District